Melsdorf is a municipality in the district of Rendsburg-Eckernförde, in Schleswig-Holstein, Germany.

References

Municipalities in Schleswig-Holstein
Rendsburg-Eckernförde